Kugaaruk Airport , formerly known as Pelly Bay Townsite Airport, is located at Kugaaruk (formerly known as Pelly Bay) in Nunavut, Canada. It is operated by the government of Nunavut.

History

The airport was built by the Government of Canada in 1968 as Pelly Bay Townsite Airport and renamed in 1999.

Facilities

The terminal building a tower are the only building at the airport.

Airlines and destinations

References

External links

Certified airports in the Kitikmeot Region